Soy Street is a street in Mong Kok, Kowloon, Hong Kong. It starts from Tak Cheong Street in the west, crosses several major streets including Nathan Road, and ends near Waterloo Road.

The section between Nathan Road and Sai Yeung Choi Street South is for pedestrians only. The section between Nathan Road and Fa Yuen Street becomes crowded with people during the holiday season and at night.

History
The name Soy Street comes from a soya bean factory located in the area long ago. In June 2004, pottery from the Eastern Han Dynasty (25–220AD) and Jin Dynasty (aka. Chin Dynasty; 266–420AD) were discovered at a construction site at the junction of Soy Street and Tung Choi Street.

See also
 List of streets and roads in Hong Kong

References

External links
 

Mong Kok
Roads in Kowloon